Theriophonum is a genus of flowering plants in the family Araceae. It is found only in India and Sri Lanka. The genus is closely related to Typhonium. The only apparent difference between the two is in how many ovules each have and the overall size of the plants. Typhoniums are bigger than Theriophonum.

Species
Theriophonum dalzellii Schott - western India
Theriophonum danielii Rajakumar, Selvak., S.Murug. & Chellap - southern India
Theriophonum fischeri Sivad. - Kerala, Tamil Nadu
Theriophonum infaustum N.E.Br. - Kerala
Theriophonum manickamii Murugan & K.Natarajan - Tamil Nadu
Theriophonum minutum (Willd.) Baill. - central and southern India, Sri Lanka. Also known as Theriophonum crenatum
Theriophonum sivaganganum (Ramam. & Sebastine) Bogner - Tamil Nadu

References

Aroideae
Araceae genera
Flora of the Indian subcontinent